Cacostatia buckwaldi is a moth of the subfamily Arctiinae. It was described by Rothschild in 1912. It is found in Brazil and Ecuador.

The forewings are black-brown slightly glossed with blue. The hindwings are hyaline.

References

Arctiinae
Moths described in 1912